The Racket is a 1927 Broadway three-act drama written by Bartlett Cormack
and produced by Alexander McKaig. It ran for 119 performances from November 22, 1927, to March 1928 at the 
Ambassador Theatre. Edward G. Robinson had a major role as a 
snarling gangster, which led to his being cast in similar film roles. It was included in Burns Mantle's 
The Best Plays of 1927-1928.

It was adapted as a silent feature film also titled The Racket in 1928 and
the 1951 film noir remake The Racket, starring Robert Mitchum.

Cast
 John Cromwell as Captain McQuigg
 Edward G. Robinson as an unidentified man	
 Edward Eliscu as	Joe
 Norman Foster as	Dave Ames	
 Harry McCoy as Turck	
 Willard Robertson as Pratt
 Ralph Adams as Sam Meyer	
 Romaine Callender as Asst. State's Attorney Welch	
 Jack Clifford as Clark	
 Marion Coakley as Irene Hayes	
 G. Pat Collins as patrolman Johnson	
 Harry English as Lt. Gill	
 Mike Flanagan as patrolman	
 Louis Frohoff as Alderman Kublacek	
 Mal Kelly as	Sgt. Sullivan	
 Fred Irving Lewis as Detective Sgt. Delaney	
 Hugh O'Connell as Miller	
 Charles O'Connor as patrolman	
 Charles Peyton as Glick	
 C.E. Smith as	Sgt. Schmidt

External links
 

1927 plays
Broadway plays
Plays set in Illinois
Chicago in fiction
American plays adapted into films